Hanne Thürmer (born 6 September 1960) is a Norwegian physician and politician for the Centre Party. She resigned her membership from the Christian Democratic Party at the start of 2019, citing the party's negotiation with the Progress Party to form a coalition government as her main reason.

She hails from Notodden, and works as a chief physician at Notodden Hospital. In 2009, she became a central board member of the Christian Democratic Party. In the 2009, 2013 and 2017 elections, she was elected as a deputy representative to the Parliament of Norway from Telemark.

References

1960 births
Living people
People from Notodden
Christian Democratic Party (Norway) politicians
Politicians from Telemark
Deputy members of the Storting
Women members of the Storting
20th-century Norwegian physicians
Norwegian women physicians
21st-century Norwegian physicians